Abadi Jallowal (New Abadi Jallowal) is in the Jalandhar City in the state of Punjab. The region code that it is situated in is 144003. The ward number is 39.

Demographics
Abadi Jallowal is located in Jalandhar City. Its neighbouring areas are Bootan Mandi, Model House, Basti Sheikh, Swami Lal Ji nagar, Deol Nagar, Guru Ravi Dass Chowk,  Mohalla Sharif Pura, New Surajganj, Block A Model House, Shiv Darshan Nagar, New Green Model Town, Park Road Model Town. It is approximately under 550m to Jalandhar-Nakodar Road.

The Councillor of this area is Smt. Surinder Kaur, Sr. Dy. Mayor. She is also the councillor of 10 other areas including New Abadi Jallowal. The previous councillor was Mr. Pawan Kumar which was in Ward No. 54 and he was the councillor of 27 other areas including Abadi Jallowal.

Religious places
Abadi Jallowal's places of worship are Guru Ravidass Ji Dharam Asthan, Darbar Baba Sunehri Sai Ji and Darbar Baba Ranga Ram Ji. It holds an annual Sobha Yatra (Julus) on the birth anniversary of Guru Ravidass Ji.

References

Cities and towns in Jalandhar district
Neighbourhoods in Punjab, India